Enprofylline (3-propylxanthine) is a xanthine derivative used in the treatment of asthma, which acts as a bronchodilator. It acts primarily as a competitive nonselective phosphodiesterase inhibitor with relatively little activity as a nonselective adenosine receptor antagonist.

References

Adenosine receptor antagonists
Bronchodilators
Phosphodiesterase inhibitors
Xanthines
Propyl compounds